Maurice Marc Lévy (7 September 1922 – 13 April 2022) was a French physicist and teacher. He was president of the CNES from 1973 to 1976.

Education
Maurice Lévy  obtained his  Baccalauréat at the Lycée Bugeaud in Algiers, and then graduated  in mathematics and physics from the University of Algiers.
He then obtained a graduate degree in optics and entered the CNRS in 1945. He left Algeria for France and  joined the Physical Research Laboratory of the Sorbonne (LRPS), directed by Jean Cabannes. After a brief stay at the University of Leiden, he defended his thesis in 1949 under the supervision of Jean Cabannes. Louis de Broglie participated in his thesis examination.

Career
In 1949, he visited the University of Manchester to work under the direction of Léon Rosenfeld. In 1950, he  joined  the Institute for Advanced Study in Princeton, directed by J. Robert Oppenheimer.

He returned to France in 1952, became senior researcher at the CNRS and worked in the physics department of the  École normale supérieure (Paris)  (ENS), directed by Yves Rocard. He taught quantum mechanics for twelve years to first-year students at the ENS. He was appointed professor at the Bordeaux Faculty of Science in 1953, then at the Paris Faculty of Science in 1954. He participated with Yves Rocard in the creation of the Linear Accelerator Laboratory (LAL).  In 1960, he established the physics summer school of Cargèse in Corsica; eventually, the program grew to the Institut d'Études Scientifiques de Cargèse.

He was a professor at the Pierre and Marie Curie University right  from its foundation in 1971, and a researcher at the Laboratory of Theoretical and High Energy Physics (LPTHE), collaborating in particular with Jean-Louis Basdevant and with John Iliopoulos.

Notable research and recognition
In 1960, he co-authored with Murray Gell-Mann a seminal paper on the Sigma model, which served as a cynosure for particle physics in the following decades, providing the modern framework for understanding the weak interactions and their interplay with chiral symmetry breaking by the strong interactions.

He was made Commandeur of the Légion d'honneur on 13 July 1993.

References

1922 births
2022 deaths
20th-century French physicists
21st-century French physicists
University of Algiers alumni
University of Paris alumni
French National Centre for Scientific Research scientists
Academic staff of the University of Bordeaux
Academic staff of Pierre and Marie Curie University
Commandeurs of the Légion d'honneur
People from Tlemcen